Belapur Fort is a fort near the township of Belapur in Navi Mumbai, Maharashtra, India. The fort was built by the Siddis of Janjira. It was later conquered by the Portuguese, and then Marathas. In the early 19th century, the fort was captured by the British. After the British gained supremacy in the region, with the expansion of the Bombay Presidency, the strategic importance of the fort declined, and it fell into disuse.

History 
Built in 1560–1570 by the Siddis, after they wrested control of the area from the Portuguese, it is located atop a hillock, near the mouth of the Panvel Creek. In 1682, the fort was recaptured by the Portuguese, who had managed to annex the regions controlled by the Siddis, near Belapur (at that time known as Shabaz).

In 1733, the Marathas, led by Chimaji Appa, wrested control of the fort from the Portuguese. He had made a vow that if it were to be successfully recaptured from the Portuguese, he would place a garland of beli leaves in a nearby Amruthaishwar temple, and after the victory the fort was christened as Belapur Fort. The Marathas ruled the area until 23 June 1817, when it was captured by Captain Charles Gray of the British East India Company. The British partially destroyed the fort under their policy of razing any Maratha stronghold in the area.

A tunnel is also supposed to exist, which many locals believe connects it to Gharapuri Island, the site of the Elephanta Caves.

Restoration 
The fort comes under the jurisdiction of City and Industrial Development Corporation (CIDCO). It lies in a dilapidated state. Plans are underway to renovate the fort which is in danger of being lost to encroachments. Residents have used the Right to Information Act to save the fort from dumping and debris. A pond in the vicinity that supplies water to the area is also in danger of being choked. There is no renovation or restoration as per the given reference as of January 2018. and the fort (or the ruins) are in pathetic state.

See also 
List of forts in Maharashtra

References 

Archaeological sites in Maharashtra
History of Mumbai
1560 in India
Navi Mumbai